Pyapon District is a district of the Ayeyarwady Division in south western Myanmar. It consists 4 cities. They are Pyapon, Bogalay, Kyaiklat and Dedaye.

Townships

The district contains the following townships:
Pyapon Township
Bogalay Township
Kyaiklat Township
Dedaye Township

In the Townships, there are 35 wards, 298 village groups and 1450 village.

Districts of Myanmar
Ayeyarwady Region